Bateman may refer to:

Places
Bateman, Western Australia, a suburb of Perth, Australia
Electoral district of Bateman, an electorate of the Western Australian Legislative Assembly, centred on the suburb
Batemans Bay, a town and bay in New South Wales, Australia
Bateman, Saskatchewan, Canada
Bateman, Wisconsin, United States

Other uses
Bateman (surname)
Bateman, pen name of author and journalist Colin Bateman
Bateman's, the home of Rudyard Kipling in Burwash, East Sussex, England
Bateman Manuscript Project
Bateman's principle, in evolutionary biology
Batemans Brewery, Lincolnshire